Pakouabo is a town in central Ivory Coast. It is a sub-prefecture of Bouaflé Department in Marahoué Region, Sassandra-Marahoué District.

Pakouabo was a commune until March 2012, when it became one of 1126 communes nationwide that were abolished.

In 2014, the population of the sub-prefecture of Pakouabo was 18,977.

Villages
The 5 villages of the sub-prefecture of Pakouabo and their population in 2014 are:
 Aka - Nguessankro (2 934)
 Diacohou-Nord (2 542)
 Krigambo (1 194)
 Pakouabo (5 742)
 Pangba-Kouamékro (6 565)

Notes

Sub-prefectures of Marahoué
Former communes of Ivory Coast